The 1983–84 Combined Counties Football League season was the sixth in the history of the Combined Counties Football League, a football competition in England.

The league was won by Godalming Town for the first time.

League table

The league was reduced from 18 to 17 clubs after Lingfield left to join the Sussex County League and no new clubs joined.

References

External links
 Combined Counties League Official Site

1983-84
1983–84 in English football leagues